Henrik Møllgaard Jensen (born 2 January 1985) is a Danish handballer for Aalborg Håndbold and the Danish national team.

He has previously played in PSG Handball, KIF Kolding, Kongeå HK, Ribe HK and Skjern Håndbold.

On 25 June 2015 it was announced that Henrik Møllgaard would be joining PSG Handball on a one-year loan contract, due to a long-term injuries with William Accambray. On 4 January 2016, Skjern Håndbold announced that Henrik Møllgaard would be joining PSG Handball permanently from the start of 2016/2017 season on a three-year contract. PSG Handball paid an undisclosed fee for the transfer. On 27 October 2017, it was announced that he would return to play for Aalborg Håndbold in 2018.

Individual awards
Best Defence Player of the European Championship: 2016
Top Goalscorer of the Danish Handball League: 2014
Best Defence Player of EHF Champions League: 2021

References

External links

Danish male handball players
1985 births
Living people
KIF Kolding players
Aalborg Håndbold players
Expatriate handball players
Danish expatriate sportspeople in France
Danish expatriate sportspeople in Qatar
Olympic handball players of Denmark
Handball players at the 2016 Summer Olympics
Medalists at the 2016 Summer Olympics
Olympic gold medalists for Denmark
Olympic medalists in handball
Handball players at the 2020 Summer Olympics
Medalists at the 2020 Summer Olympics
Olympic silver medalists for Denmark